The following is a list of players, both past and current, who appeared on the roster for the Toronto Raptors NBA franchise.



Players
Note: Statistics were last updated on March 6, 2022.

A to B

|-
|align="left"| || align="center"|F/C || align="left"|Baylor || align="center"|2 || align="center"|– || 36 || 403 || 92 || 15 || 135 || 11.2 || 2.6 || 0.4 || 3.8 || align=center|
|-
|align="left"| || align="center"|G || align="left"|Arizona || align="center"|1 || align="center"| || 12 || 52 || 7 || 1 || 11 || 4.3 || 0.6 || 0.1 || 0.9 || align=center|
|-
|align="left"| || align="center"|F/C || align="left"| HTV || align="center"|1 || align="center"| || 24 || 265 || 61 || 8 || 114 || 11.0 || 2.5 || 0.3 || 4.8 || align=center|
|-
|align="left"| || align="center"|C || align="left"|Florida State || align="center"|2 || align="center"|– || 26 || 181 || 61 || 5 || 39 || 7.0 || 2.3 || 0.2 || 1.5 || align=center|
|-
|align="left"| || align="center"|G || align="left"|Fresno State || align="center"|2 || align="center"| || 127 || 3,697 || 386 || 706 || 1,502 || 29.1 || 3.0 || 5.6 || 11.8 || align=center|
|-
|align="left"| || align="center"|C || align="left"| Virtus Bologna || align="center"|1 || align="center"| || 11 || 150 || 34 || 7 || 56 || 13.6 || 3.1 || 0.6 || 5.1 || align=center|
|-
|align="left"| || align="center"|G/F || align="left"|Michigan State || align="center"|2 || align="center"|– || 82 || 1,956 || 182 || 129 || 856 || 23.9 || 2.2 || 1.6 || 10.4 || align=center|
|-
|align="left"| || align="center"|G/F || align="left"|Georgia || align="center"|1 || align="center"| || 49 || 1,564 || 186 || 149 || 606 || 31.9 || 3.8 || 3.0 || 12.4 || align=center|
|-
|align="left" bgcolor="#CCFFCC"|x || align="center"|F || align="left"|Indiana || align="center"|4 || align="center"|– || 253 || 6,332 || 982 || 304 || 2,322 || 25.0 || 3.9 || 1.2 || 9.2 || align=center|
|-
|align="left"| || align="center"|C || align="left"|BYU || align="center"|2 || align="center"|– || 111 || 1,337 || 329 || 31 || 317 || 12.0 || 3.0 || 0.3 || 2.9 || align=center|
|-
|align="left"| || align="center"|F || align="left"|Illinois || align="center"|1 || align="center"| || 30 || 246 || 50 || 12 || 29 || 8.2 || 1.7 || 0.4 || 1.0 || align=center|
|-
|align="left"| || align="center"|G || align="left"|FIU || align="center"|1 || align="center"| || 17 || 96 || 12 || 21 || 30 || 5.6 || 0.7 || 1.2 || 1.8 || align=center|
|-
|align="left"| || align="center"|G || align="left"|Texas || align="center"|1 || align="center"| || 10 || 82 || 4 || 10 || 21 || 8.2 || 0.4 || 1.0 || 2.1 || align=center|
|-
|align="left"| || align="center"|G || align="left"|Ohio State || align="center"|1 || align="center"| || 1 || 2 || 0 || 0 || 0 || 2.0 || 0.0 || 0.0 || 0.0 || align=center|
|-
|align="left"| || align="center"|G || align="left"|UNLV || align="center"|3 || align="center"|– || 31 || 306 || 27 || 35 || 129 || 9.9 || 0.9 || 1.1 || 4.2 || align=center|
|-
|align="left"| || align="center"|G || align="left"| Bauru Basket || align="center"|2 || align="center"|– || 100 || 2,341 || 178 || 182 || 1,281 || 23.4 || 1.8 || 1.8 || 12.8 || align=center|
|-
|align="left"| || align="center"|F/C || align="left"| Benetton Treviso || align="center"|7 || align="center"|– || 433 || 13,130 || 2,095 || 544 || 6,581 || 30.3 || 4.8 || 1.3 || 15.2 || align=center|
|-
|align="left"| || align="center"|G || align="left"|Seton Hall || align="center"|1 || align="center"| || 17 || 261 || 22 || 50 || 78 || 15.4 || 1.3 || 2.9 || 4.6 || align=center|
|-
|align="left"| || align="center"|F || align="left"|Michigan || align="center"|2 || align="center"| || 31 || 209 || 49 || 3 || 81 || 6.7 || 1.6 || 0.1 || 2.6 || align=center|
|-
|align="left"| || align="center"|C || align="left"| Beijing Ducks || align="center"|1 || align="center"| || 7 || 40 || 8 || 1 || 8 || 5.7 || 1.1 || 0.1 || 1.1 || align=center|
|-
|align="left"| || align="center"|F || align="left"|Maryland || align="center"|1 || align="center"| || 36 || 487 || 121 || 10 || 150 || 13.5 || 3.4 || 0.3 || 4.2 || align=center|
|-
|align="left"| || align="center"|G || align="left"|Arizona || align="center"|2 || align="center"|– || 91 || 2,052 || 216 || 356 || 954 || 22.5 || 2.4 || 3.9 || 10.5 || align=center|
|-
|align="left"| || align="center"|C || align="left"|Washington State || align="center"|1 || align="center"| || 53 || 980 || 273 || 47 || 324 || 18.5 || 5.2 || 0.9 || 6.1 || align=center|
|-
|align="left"| || align="center"|G/F || align="left"| Fortitudo Bologna || align="center"|1 || align="center"| || 66 || 1,121 || 95 || 89 || 469 || 17.0 || 1.4 || 1.3 || 7.1 || align=center|
|-
|align="left"| || align="center"|G/F || align="left"|Saint Josephs || align="center"|1 || align="center"| || 51 || 972 || 146 || 107 || 293 || 19.1 || 2.9 || 2.1 || 5.7 || align=center|
|-
|align="left"| || align="center"|C || align="left"|Creighton || align="center"|1 || align="center"| || 4 || 44 || 9 || 1 || 13 || 11.0 || 2.3 || 0.3 || 3.3 || align=center|
|-
|align="left"| || align="center"|F || align="left"|UNLV || align="center"|1 || align="center"| || 19 || 84 || 23 || 0 || 28 || 4.4 || 1.2 || 0.0 || 1.5 || align=center|
|-
|align="left"| || align="center"|G || align="left"|Colorado || align="center"|1 || align="center"| || 29 || 920 || 77 || 97 || 328 || 31.7 || 2.7 || 3.3 || 11.3 || align=center|
|-
|align="left" bgcolor="#CCFFCC"|x || align="center"|C || align="left"|UNLV || align="center"|1 || align="center"| || 19 || 577 || 144 || 36 || 227 || 30.4 || 7.6 || 1.9 || 11.9 || align=center|
|-
|align="left"| || align="center"|F/C || align="left"| Fuenlabrada || align="center"|1 || align="center"| || 82 || 1,808 || 655 || 29 || 454 || 22.0 || 8.0 || 0.4 || 5.5 || align=center|
|-
|align="left"| || align="center"|F || align="left"|Cincinnati || align="center"|1 || align="center"| || 16 || 294 || 69 || 10 || 38 || 18.4 || 4.3 || 0.6 || 2.4 || align=center|
|-
|align="left"| || align="center"|G || align="left"|Wake Forest || align="center"|2 || align="center"|– || 83 || 1,765 || 138 || 304 || 410 || 21.3 || 1.7 || 3.7 || 4.9 || align=center|
|-
|align="left"| || align="center"|F || align="left"|Florida || align="center"|2 || align="center"|– || 160 || 3,263 || 569 || 104 || 1,172 || 20.4 || 3.6 || 0.7 || 7.3 || align=center|
|-
|align="left" bgcolor="#FFFF99" |^ + || align="center"|F/C || align="left"|Georgia Tech || align="center"|7 || align="center"|– || 509 || 18,815 || bgcolor="#CFECEC"|4,776 || 1,115 || 10,275 || 37.0 || bgcolor="#CFECEC"|9.4 || 2.2 || 20.2 || align=center|
|-
|align="left" bgcolor="#CCFFCC"|x || align="center"|F || align="left"|Oregon || align="center"|3 || align="center"|– || 150 || 2,435 || 737 || 91 || 1,322 || 16.2 || 4.9 || 0.6 || 8.8 || align=center|
|-
|align="left"| || align="center"|F/C || align="left"|Villanova || align="center"|3 || align="center"|– || 98 || 1,470 || 444 || 71 || 371 || 15.0 || 4.5 || 0.7 || 3.8 || align=center|
|-
|align="left"| || align="center"|C || align="left"| Olimpija || align="center"|1 || align="center"| || 13 || 110 || 18 || 1 || 48 || 8.5 || 1.4 || 0.1 || 3.7 || align=center|
|-
|align="left"| || align="center"|F || align="left"|Syracuse || align="center"|1 || align="center"| || 19 || 135 || 26 || 7 || 37 || 7.1 || 1.4 || 0.4 || 1.9 || align=center|
|-
|align="left"| || align="center"|F || align="left"|Syracuse || align="center"|1 || align="center"| || 5 || 115 || 15 || 3 || 28 || 23.0 || 3.0 || 0.6 || 5.6 || align=center|
|-
|align="left"| || align="center"|G || align="left"|Jacksonville || align="center"|3 || align="center"|– || 118 || 2,958 || 247 || 330 || 1,191 || 25.1 || 2.1 || 2.8 || 10.1 || align=center|
|-
|align="left"| || align="center"|G || align="left"|NC State || align="center"|2 || align="center"|– || 40 || 351 || 46 || 41 || 87 || 8.8 || 1.2 || 1.0 || 2.2 || align=center|
|-
|align="left"| || align="center"|G || align="left"|Temple || align="center"|1 || align="center"| || 3 || 10 || 0 || 2 || 4 || 3.3 || 0.0 || 0.7 || 1.3 || align=center|
|-
|align="left"| || align="center"|G/F || align="left"|La Salle || align="center"|1 || align="center"| || 34 || 453 || 66 || 19 || 110 || 13.3 || 1.9 || 0.6 || 3.2 || align=center|
|-
|align="left"| || align="center"|G || align="left"|Marquette || align="center"|1 || align="center"| || 14 || 146 || 23 || 10 || 43 || 10.4 || 1.6 || 0.7 || 3.1 || align=center|
|}

C to D

|-
|align="left"| || align="center"|F || align="left"| Pinheiros Basquete || align="center"|4 || align="center"|– || 25 || 113 || 15 || 6 || 27 || 4.5 || 0.6 || 0.2 || 1.1 || align=center|
|-
|align="left"| || align="center"|G || align="left"| Saski Baskonia || align="center"|8 || align="center"|– || 525 || 14,909 || 1,315 || 3,770 || 5,235 || 28.4 || 2.5 || 7.2 || 10.0 || align=center|
|-
|align="left"| || align="center"|F/C || align="left"|UMass || align="center"|2 || align="center"|– || 126 || 3,899 || 860 || 208 || 1,700 || 30.9 || 6.8 || 1.7 || 13.5 || align=center|
|-
|align="left"| || align="center"|F || align="left"|Missouri || align="center"|2 || align="center"|– || 98 || 2,668 || 397 || 101 || 924 || 27.2 || 4.1 || 1.0 || 9.4 || align=center|
|-
|align="left"| || align="center"|G || align="left"|Hawaii || align="center"|1 || align="center"| || 24 || 209 || 33 || 34 || 47 || 8.7 || 1.4 || 1.4 || 2.0 || align=center|
|-
|align="left" bgcolor="#FFCC00"|+ || align="center"|G/F || align="left"|North Carolina || align="center"|7 || align="center"|– || 403 || 15,114 || 2,091 || 1,553 || 9,420 || 37.5 || 5.2 || 3.9 || 23.4 || align=center|
|-
|align="left"| || align="center"|G || align="left"|Boise State || align="center"|2 || align="center"|– || 95 || 2,126 || 218 || 470 || 402 || 22.4 || 2.3 || 4.9 || 4.2 || align=center|
|-
|align="left"| || align="center"|G/F || align="left"|Pepperdine || align="center"|5 || align="center"|– || 314 || 10,916 || 1,448 || 1,197 || 4,448 || 34.8 || 4.6 || 3.8 || 14.2 || align=center|
|-
|align="left"| || align="center"|F/C || align="left"|UNLV || align="center"|2 || align="center"|– || 127 || 3,153 || 851 || 126 || 1,328 || 24.8 || 6.7 || 1.0 || 10.5 || align=center|
|-
|align="left"| || align="center"|G || align="left"|St. John's || align="center"|1 || align="center"| || 5 || 74 || 7 || 22 || 23 || 14.8 || 1.4 || 4.4 || 4.6 || align=center|
|-
|align="left"| || align="center"|G/F || align="left"|DePaul || align="center"|1 || align="center"| || 15 || 117 || 13 || 4 || 20 || 7.8 || 0.9 || 0.3 || 1.3 || align=center|
|-
|align="left"| || align="center"|C || align="left"|Temple || align="center"|1 || align="center"| || 1 || 1 || 0 || 0 || 0 || 1.0 || 0.0 || 0.0 || 0.0 || align=center|
|-
|align="left"| || align="center"|F/C || align="left"|Detroit Mercy || align="center"|1 || align="center"| || 9 || 46 || 9 || 4 || 7 || 5.1 || 1.0 || 0.4 || 0.8 || align=center|
|-
|align="left"| || align="center"|G || align="left"|Virginia Tech || align="center"|3 || align="center"|– || 194 || 2,937 || 266 || 225 || 1,296 || 15.1 || 1.4 || 1.2 || 6.7 || align=center|
|-
|align="left"| || align="center"|G/F || align="left"|Georgia Southern || align="center"|1 || align="center"| || 70 || 1,229 || 87 || 53 || 204 || 17.6 || 1.2 || 0.8 || 2.9 || align=center|
|-
|align="left"| || align="center"|G || align="left"|Mt. SAC || align="center"|1 || align="center"| || 6 || 82 || 7 || 4 || 34 || 13.7 || 1.2 || 0.7 || 5.7 || align=center|
|-
|align="left"| || align="center"|F || align="left"| Budapesti Honvéd || align="center"|1 || align="center"| || 17 || 140 || 33 || 4 || 42 || 8.2 || 1.9 || 0.2 || 2.5 || align=center|
|-
|align="left" bgcolor="#FFCC00"|+ || align="center"|F/C || align="left"|UTEP || align="center"|6 || align="center"|– || 310 || 10,809 || 2,839 || 518 || 3,994 || 34.9 || 9.2 || 1.7 || 12.9 || align=center|
|-
|align="left"| || align="center"|F || align="left"|North Carolina || align="center"|3 || align="center"|– || 176 || 4,223 || 1,200 || 155 || 1,354 || 24.0 || 6.8 || 0.9 || 7.7 || align=center|
|-
|align="left"| || align="center"|G || align="left"|North Carolina || align="center"|1 || align="center"| || 36 || 623 || 40 || 34 || 181 || 17.3 || 1.1 || 0.9 || 5.0 || align=center|
|-
|align="left"|  || align="center"|G || align="left"|Mississippi || align="center"|2 || align="center"|– || 106 || 1,702 || 286 || 138 || 777 || 16.1 || 2.9 || 1.4 || 7.3 || align=center|
|-
|align="left"| || align="center"|F || align="left"|Gonzaga || align="center"|1 || align="center"| || 8 || 33 || 7 || 2 || 8 || 4.1 || 0.9 || 0.3 || 1.0 || align=center|
|-
|align="left"| || align="center"|G || align="left"| Cholet Basket || align="center"|1 || align="center"| || 21 || 193 || 28 || 33 || 65 || 9.2 || 1.3 || 1.6 || 3.1 || align=center|
|-
|align="left"| || align="center"|G || align="left"| Fortitudo Bologna || align="center"|1 || align="center"| || 82 || 1,928 || 359 || 145 || 738 || 23.5 || 4.4 || 1.8 || 9.0 || align=center|
|-
|align="left"| || align="center"|G || align="left"|Washington || align="center"|1 || align="center"| || 4 || 72 || 7 || 9 || 22 || 18.0 || 1.8 || 2.3 || 5.5 || align=center|
|-
|align="left" bgcolor="#FFCC00"|+ || align="center"|G/F || align="left"|USC || align="center" bgcolor="#CFECEC"|9 || align="center"|– || bgcolor="#CFECEC"|675 || bgcolor="#CFECEC"|22,986 || 2,739 || 2,078 || bgcolor="#CFECEC"|13,296 || 34.1 || 4.1 || 3.1 || 19.7 || align=center|
|-
|align="left"| || align="center"|G || align="left"|Eastern Michigan || align="center"|1 || align="center"| || 7 || 50 || 11 || 4 || 28 || 7.1 || 1.6 || 0.6 || 4.0 || align=center|
|-
|align="left"| || align="center"|G || align="left"|Maryland || align="center"|2 || align="center"|– || 62 || 1,107 || 120 || 106 || 441 || 17.9 || 1.9 || 1.7 || 7.1 || align=center|
|-
|align="left"| || align="center"|F || align="left"|Memphis || align="center"|1 || align="center"| || 43 || 522 || 190 || 27 || 135 || 12.1 || 4.4 || 0.6 || 3.1 || align=center|
|-
|align="left"| || align="center"|G || align="left"|Rutgers || align="center"|1 || align="center"| || 7 || 73 || 7 || 12 || 31 || 10.4 || 1.0 || 1.7 || 4.4 || align=center|
|-
|align="left"| || align="center"|G || align="left"|Union Olimpija || align="center"|1 || align="center"| || 5 || 90 || 14 || 9 || 40 || 18.0 || 2.8 || 1.8 || 8.0 || align=center|
|-
|align="left"| || align="center"|F || align="left"|LSU || align="center"|1 || align="center"| || 3 || 13 || 3 || 1 || 2 || 4.3 || 1.0 || 0.3 || 0.7 || align=center|
|}

E to H

|-
|align="left"| || align="center"|F/C || align="left"|Iowa || align="center"|2 || align="center"|– || 80 || 1,112 || 214 || 45 || 478 || 13.9 || 2.7 || 0.6 || 6.0 || align=center|
|-
|align="left"| || align="center"|F/C || align="left"|Marquette || align="center"|1 || align="center"| || 2 || 38 || 12 || 5 || 15 || 19 || 6.0 || 2.5 || 7.6 || align=center|
|-
|align="left"| || align="center"|G || align="left"| JuveCaserta Basket || align="center"|1 || align="center"| || 30 || 282 || 16 || 23 || 116 || 9.4 || 0.5 || 0.8 || 3.9 || align=center|
|-
|align="left"| || align="center"|F || align="left"|Iowa || align="center"|2 || align="center"|– || 58 || 1,109 || 450 || 46 || 227 || 19.1 || 7.8 || 0.8 || 3.9 || align=center|
|-
|align="left"| || align="center"|F || align="left"|Stanford || align="center"|3 || align="center"|– || 107 || 1,575 || 293 || 95 || 354 || 14.7 || 2.7 || 0.9 || 3.3 || align=center|
|-
|align="left" bgcolor="#CCFFCC"|x || align="center"|G || align="left"| San Diego State || align="center"|1 || align="center"| || 47 || 928 || 116 || 137 || 353 || 19.7 || 2.5 || 2.9 || 7.5 || align=center|
|-
|align="left"| || align="center"|F || align="left"|UMass || align="center"|1 || align="center"| || 48 || 713 || 102 || 54 || 319 || 14.9 || 2.1 || 1.1 || 6.6 || align=center|
|-
|align="left"| || align="center"|G || align="left"|Texas || align="center"|2 || align="center"|– || 126 || 3,442 || 336 || 908 || 1,664 || 27.3 || 2.7 || 7.2 || 13.2 || align=center|
|-
|align="left"| || align="center"|F/C || align="left"|UTEP || align="center"|1 || align="center"| || 29 || 539 || 102 || 13 || 121 || 18.6 || 3.5 || 0.4 || 4.2 || align=center|
|-
|align="left"| || align="center"|G || align="left"|Georgia || align="center"|1 || align="center"| || 6 || 90 || 8 || 11 || 35 || 15.0 || 1.3 || 1.8 || 5.8 || align=center|
|-
|align="left"| || align="center"|F || align="left"| Saski Baskonia || align="center"|2 || align="center"|– || 74 || 1,983 || 345 || 128 || 589 || 26.8 || 4.7 || 1.7 || 8.0 || align=center|
|-
|align="left"| || align="center"|G || align="left"|Memphis || align="center"|1 || align="center"| || 38 || 293 || 24 || 45 || 53 || 7.7 || 0.6 || 1.2 || 1.4 || align=center|
|-
|align="left"| || align="center"|C || align="left"| CB Sant Josep || align="center"|2 || align="center"|– || 70 || 1809 || 447 || 248 || 568 || 25.8 || 6.4 || 3.5 || 8.1 || align=center|
|-
|align="left"| || align="center"|F || align="left"|UConn || align="center"|2 || align="center"|– || 51 || 1,785 || 345 || 134 || 993 || 35.0 || 6.8 || 2.6 || 19.5 || align=center|
|-
|align="left"| || align="center"|C || align="left"| Baylor || align="center"|1 || align="center"| || 20 || 392 || 97 || 9 || 111 || 19.6 || 4.9 || 0.5|| 5.6 || align=center|
|-
|align="left"| || align="center"|G || align="left"|Georgia Tech || align="center"|1 || align="center"| || 14 || 178 || 29 || 15 || 64 || 12.7 || 2.1 || 1.1 || 4.6 || align=center|
|-
|align="left"| || align="center"|F || align="left"|Oklahoma State || align="center"|4 || align="center"|– || 275 || 4,772 || 851 || 167 || 1,771 || 17.4 || 3.1 || 0.6 || 6.4 || align=center|
|-
|align="left"| || align="center"|C || align="left"|Pittsburgh || align="center"|3 || align="center"|– || 95 || 1,346 || 422 || 63 || 315 || 14.2 || 4.4 || 0.7 || 3.3 || align=center|
|-
|align="left"| || align="center"|G/F || align="left"|North Carolina || align="center"|1 || align="center"| || 80 || 2,216 || 317 || 126 || 821 || 27.7 || 4.0 || 1.6 || 10.3 || align=center|
|-
|align="left"| || align="center"|F/C || align="left"|St. John's || align="center"|1 || align="center"| || 3 || 12 || 4 || 0 || 6 || 4.0 || 1.3 || 0.0 || 2.0 || align=center|
|-
|align="left"| || align="center"|F || align="left"|North Carolina || align="center"|2 || align="center"|– || 138 || 2,036 || 552 || 38 || 582 || 14.8 || 4.0 || 0.3 || 4.2 || align=center|
|-
|align="left"| || align="center"|G || align="left"| Nevada || align="center"|1 || align="center"| || 13 || 172 || 18 || 17 || 96 || 13.2 || 1.4 || 1.3 || 7.4 || align=center|
|-
|align="left"| || align="center"|F/C || align="left"|Kentucky || align="center"|2 || align="center"|– || 74 || 830 || 214 || 49 || 149 || 11.2 || 2.9 || 0.7 || 2.0 || align=center|
|-
|align="left"| || align="center"|F || align="left"|Wisconsin || align="center"|1 || align="center"| || 2 || 6 || 0 || 0 || 6 || 3.0 || 0.0 || 0.0 || 3.0 || align=center|
|-
|align="left"| || align="center"|C || align="left"| Miami (Fl) || align="center"|1 || align="center"| || 6 || 28 || 14 || 3 || 14 || 4.7 || 2.3 || 0.5|| 2.3 || align=center|
|-
|align="left"| || align="center"|F || align="left"| Arizona || align="center"|1 || align="center"| || 60 || 1122 || 283 || 106 || 418 || 18.7 || 4.7 || 1.8 || 7.0 || align=center|
|-
|align="left"| || align="center"|G/F || align="left"| Duke || align="center"|1 || align="center"| || 17 || 216 || 30 || 6 || 66 || 12.7 || 1.8 || 0.4 || 3.9 || align=center|
|-
|align="left"| || align="center"|C || align="left"|Central Michigan || align="center"|1 || align="center"| || 7 || 76 || 23 || 5 || 23 || 10.9 || 3.3 || 0.7 || 3.3 || align=center|
|-
|align="left"| || align="center"|F/C || align="left"|Minnesota || align="center"|3 || align="center"|– || 159 || 1,860 || 516 || 56 || 738 || 11.7 || 3.2 || 0.4 || 4.6 || align=center|
|-
|align="left"| || align="center"|G || align="left"|Jackson State || align="center"|1 || align="center"| || 29 || 673 || 59 || 71 || 280 || 23.2 || 2.0 || 2.4 || 9.7 || align=center|
|}

I to K

|-
|align="left"| || align="center"|F/C || align="left"| CB L'Hospitalet || align="center"|4 || align="center"|– || 228 || 6300 || 1,687 || 253 || 3,243 || 27.6 || 7.4 || 1.1 || 14.2 || align=center|
|-
|align="left"| || align="center"|G || align="left"|Georgia Tech || align="center"|2 || align="center"|– || 95 || 2,590 || 264 || 472 || 1,071 || 27.3 || 2.8 || 5.0 || 11.3 || align=center|
|-
|align="left"| || align="center"|G || align="left"|Detroit Mercy || align="center"|2 || align="center"|– || 48 || 566 || 52 || 96 || 123 || 11.8 || 1.1 || 2.0 || 2.6 || align=center|
|-
|align="left"| || align="center"|F || align="left"|Oregon || align="center"|1 || align="center"| || 10 || 122 || 9 || 9 || 45 || 12.2 || 0.9 || 0.9 || 4.5 || align=center|
|-
|align="left"| || align="center"|G || align="left"|St. John's || align="center"|1 || align="center"| || 54 || 1,802 || 185 || 498 || 461 || 33.4 || 3.4 || bgcolor="#CFECEC"|9.2 || 8.5 || align=center|
|-
|align="left"| || align="center"|G || align="left"|Duquesne || align="center"|1 || align="center"| || 79 || 2,925 || 262 || 460 || 1,604 || 37.0 || 3.3 || 5.8 || 20.3 || align=center|
|-
|align="left"| || align="center"|F/C || align="left"|Midland College || align="center"|1 || align="center"| || 6 || 19 || 2 || 0 || 2 || 3.2 || 0.3 || 0.0 || 0.3 || align=center|
|-
|align="left"| || align="center"|G/F || align="left"|Fresno State || align="center"|2 || align="center"|– || 53 || 674 || 60 || 23 || 205 || 12.7 || 1.1 || 0.4 || 3.9 || align=center|
|-
|align="left"| || align="center"|F/C || align="left"|Westchester HS (CA) || align="center"|6 || align="center"|– || 451 || 11,377 || 2,836 || 562 || 3,957 || 25.2 || 6.3 || 1.2 || 8.8 || align=center|
|-
|align="left"| || align="center"|F || align="left"|Wake Forest || align="center"|4 || align="center"|–– || 214 || 4,556 || 793 || 359 || 1,636 || 21.3 || 3.7 || 1.7 || 7.6 || align=center|
|-
|align="left"| || align="center"|F || align="left"|Tulane || align="center"|1 || align="center"| || 2 || 10 || 1 || 1 || 6 || 5.0 || 0.5 || 0.5 || 3.0 || align=center|
|-
|align="left" bgcolor="#CCFFCC"|x || align="center"|G/F || align="left"|Arizona || align="center"|2 || align="center"|– || 86 || 1,156 || 190 || 109 || 327 || 13.4 || 2.2 || 1.3 || 3.8 || align=center|
|-
|align="left"| || align="center"|G || align="left"|Jackson State || align="center"|1 || align="center"| || 7 || 81 || 7 || 11 || 28 || 11.6 || 1.0 || 1.6 || 4.0 || align=center|
|-
|align="left"| || align="center"|G/F || align="left"|Oregon || align="center"|1 || align="center"| || 39 || 870 || 82 || 55 || 297 || 22.3 || 2.1 || 1.4 || 7.6 || align=center|
|-
|align="left"| || align="center"|F || align="left"|Murray State || align="center"|2 || align="center"|– || 93 || 2,773 || 782 || 102 || 736 || 29.8 || 8.4 || 1.1 || 7.9 || align=center|
|-
|align="left"| || align="center"|G || align="left"|Texas || align="center"|2 || align="center"|– || 160 || 4,049 || 445 || 515 || 1,417 || 25.3 || 2.8 || 3.2 || 8.9 || align=center|
|-
|align="left"| || align="center"|C || align="left"|Saint Rose || align="center"|1 || align="center"| || 2 || 8 || 2 || 1 || 2 || 4.0 || 1.0 || 0.5 || 1.0 || align=center|
|-
|align="left"| || align="center"|F || align="left"|UCLA || align="center"|2 || align="center"|– || 161 || 3,361 || 283 || 170 || 1,234 || 20.9 || 1.8 || 1.1 || 7.7 || align=center|
|-
|align="left"| || align="center"|F/C || align="left"|Notre Dame || align="center"|1 || align="center"| || 5 || 32 || 5 || 2 || 4 || 6.4 || 1.0 || 0.4 || 0.8 || align=center|
|-
|align="left"| || align="center"|G || align="left"|Michigan || align="center"|1 || align="center"| || 62 || 868 || 110 || 88 || 279 || 14.0 || 1.8 || 1.4 || 4.5 || align=center|
|-
|align="left"| || align="center"|F || align="left"|Missouri || align="center"|3 || align="center"|– || 108 || 2,465 || 428 || 102 || 1,057 || 22.8 || 4.0 || 0.9 || 9.8 || align=center|
|-
|align="left"| || align="center"|G || align="left"|Dayton || align="center"|1 || align="center"| || 6 || 56 || 6 || 8 || 8 || 9.3 || 1.0 || 1.3 || 1.3 || align=center|
|}

L to M

|-
|align="left"| || align="center"|G/F || align="left"|Duke || align="center"|1 || align="center"| || 7 || 32 || 5 || 1 || 3 || 4.6 || 0.7 || 0.1 || 0.4 || align=center|
|-
|align="left"| || align="center"|C || align="left"|Maryland || align="center"|1 || align="center"| || 7 || 76 || 11 || 3 || 16 || 10.9 || 1.6 || 0.4 || 2.3 || align=center|
|-
|align="left"| || align="center"|G || align="left"|Minnesota || align="center"|1 || align="center"| || 63 || 1,929 || 212 || 144 || 898 || 30.6 || 3.4 || 2.3 || 14.3 || align=center|
|-
|align="left" bgcolor="#FFCC00"|+ || align="center"|F || align="left"|San Diego State || align="center"|1 || align="center"| || 60 || 2,040 || 439 || 199 || 1,596 || 34.0 || 7.3 || 3.3 || bgcolor="#CFECEC"|26.6 || align=center|
|-
|align="left"| || align="center"|F || align="left"|Seward County CC || align="center"|2 || align="center"|– || 25 || 239 || 35 || 7 || 89 || 9.6 || 1.4 || 0.3 || 3.6 || align=center|
|-
|align="left"| || align="center"|G || align="left"|Harvard || align="center"|1 || align="center"| || 23 || 433 || 60 || 50 || 161 || 18.8 || 2.6 || 2.2 || 7.0 || align=center|
|-
|align="left"| || align="center"|F/C || align="left"|Iowa || align="center"|1 || align="center"| || 6 || 45 || 7 || 1 || 10 || 7.5 || 1.2 || 0.2 || 1.7 || align=center|
|-
|align="left"| || align="center"|F || align="left"|Cincinnati || align="center"|1 || align="center"| || 7 || 80 || 20 || 4 || 20 || 11.4 || 2.9 || 0.6 || 2.9 || align=center|
|-
|align="left"| || align="center"|G/F || align="left"|Detroit Mercy || align="center"|1 || align="center"| || 32 || 370 || 40 || 21 || 129 || 11.6 || 1.3 || 0.7 || 4.0 || align=center|
|-
|align="left" bgcolor="#FBCEB1"|* || align="center"|G || align="left"|Villanova || align="center" bgcolor="#CFECEC"|9 || align="center"|– || 601 || 20,813 || 2,954 ||bgcolor="#CFECEC"| 4,277 || 10,540 || 34.6 || 4.9 || 7.1 || 17.5 || align=center|
|-
|align="left"| || align="center"|G || align="left"|Indianapolis || align="center"|1 || align="center"| || 12 || 55 || 9 || 6 || 29 || 4.6 || 0.8 || 0.5 || 2.4 || align=center|
|-
|align="left"| || align="center"|G || align="left"|Oklahoma State || align="center"|1 || align="center"| || 63 || 827 || 65 || 105 || 333 || 13.1 || 1.0 || 1.7 || 5.3 || align=center|
|-
|align="left"| || align="center"|C || align="left"|Kentucky || align="center"|1 || align="center"| || 34 || 374 || 113 || 6 || 41 || 11.0 || 3.3 || 0.2 || 1.2 || align=center|
|-
|align="left"| || align="center"|F || align="left"|UNLV || align="center"|1 || align="center"| || 27 || 954 || 224 || 62 || 386 || 35.3 || 8.3 || 2.3 || 14.3 || align=center|
|-
|align="left"| || align="center"|F/C || align="left"|California || align="center"|2 || align="center"|– || 13 || 40 || 3 || 0 || 19 || 3.1 || 0.2 || 0.0 || 1.5 || align=center|
|-
|align="left"| || align="center"|F || align="left"|UConn || align="center"|2 || align="center"|– || 131 || 4,225 || 1,137 || 175 || 1,813 || 32.3 || 8.7 || 1.3 || 13.8 || align=center|
|-
|align="left"| || align="center"|G || align="left"|UCLA || align="center"|3 || align="center"|– || 88 || 700 || 39 || 121 || 223 || 8.0 || 0.4 || 1.4 || 2.5 || align=center|
|-
|align="left"| || align="center"|G || align="left"|Virginia || align="center"|1 || align="center"| || 23 || 285 || 28 || 23 || 93 || 12.4 || 1.2 || 1.0 || 4.0 || align=center|
|-
|align="left"| || align="center"|F || align="left"|Maryland || align="center"|1 || align="center"| || 24 || 659 || 166 || 18 || 243 || 27.5 || 6.9 || 0.8 || 10.1 || align=center|
|-
|align="left"| || align="center"|F || align="left"|Morehead State || align="center"|1 || align="center"| || 1 || 5 || 1 || 0 || 0 || 5.0 || 1.0 || 0.0 || 0.0 || align=center|
|-
|align="left"| || align="center"|G || align="left"|UNLV || align="center"|3 || align="center"|– || 68 || 1285 || 134 || 110 || 244 || 18.9 || 2.0 || 1.6 || 3.6 || align=center|
|-
|align="left"| || align="center"|C || align="left"|UCLA || align="center"|1 || align="center"| || 67 || 1,367 || 355 || 43 || 457 || 20.4 || 5.3 || 0.6 || 6.8 || align=center|
|-
|align="left" bgcolor="#FFFF99"|^ || align="center"|G/F || align="left"|MZCA (NC) || align="center"|3 || align="center"|– || 192 || 4,747 || 1,048 || 474 || 2,122 || 24.7 || 5.5 || 2.5 || 11.1 || align=center|
|-
|align="left"| || align="center"|F || align="left"|Fresno State || align="center"|1 || align="center"| || 15 || 230 || 48 || 10 || 32 || 15.3 || 3.2 || 0.7 || 2.1 || align=center|
|-
|align="left"| || align="center"|F || align="left"|Green Bay || align="center"|1 || align="center"| || 14 || 53 || 7 || 1 || 21 || 3.8 || 0.5 || 0.1 || 1.5 || align=center|
|-
|align="left"| || align="center"|G || align="left"|Kentucky || align="center"|1 || align="center"| || 8 || 104 || 12 || 8 || 51 || 13.0 || 1.5 || 1.0 || 6.4 || align=center|
|-
|align="left"| || align="center"|F || align="left"|George Washington || align="center"|2 || align="center"| || 35 || 370 || 134 || 8 || 130 || 10.6 || 3.8 || 0.2 || 3.7 || align=center|
|-
|align="left"| || align="center"|G/F || align="left"|Skyline HS (TX) || align="center"|2 || align="center"|– || 110 || 1,899 || 220 || 77 || 917 || 17.3 || 2.0 || 0.7 || 8.3 || align=center|
|-
|align="left"| || align="center"|F || align="left"|Holy Cross || align="center"|3 || align="center"|– || 53 || 355 || 36 || 15 || 108 || 6.7 || 0.7 || 0.3 || 2.0 || align=center|
|-
|align="left"| || align="center"|C || align="left"|Arkansas || align="center"|3 || align="center"|– || 159 || 4,460 || 1,035 || 444 || 1,497 || 28.1 || 6.5 || 2.8 || 9.4 || align=center|
|-
|align="left"| || align="center"|F/C || align="left"|UCLA || align="center"|2 || align="center"|– || 43 || 486 || 136 || 8 || 116 || 11.3 || 3.2 || 0.2 || 2.7 || align=center|
|-
|align="left"| || align="center"|F/C || align="left"|Georgetown || align="center"|1 || align="center"| || 38 || 423 || 156 || 16 || 183 || 11.1 || 4.1 || 0.4 || 4.8 || align=center|
|-
|align="left"| || align="center"|C || align="left"|North Carolina || align="center"|2 || align="center"|– || 61 || 736 || 169 || 20 || 129 || 12.1 || 2.8 || 0.3 || 2.1 || align=center|
|-
|align="left"| || align="center"|F || align="left"|Meridian CC || align="center"|2 || align="center"|– || 132 || 3,545 || 733 || 160 || 1,054 || 26.9 || 5.6 || 1.2 || 8.0 || align=center|
|-
|align="left"| || align="center"|F/C || align="left"|Oregon State || align="center"|1 || align="center"| || 4 || 38 || 17 || 4 || 7 || 9.5 || 4.3 || 1.0 || 1.8 || align=center|
|-
|align="left"| || align="center"|F || align="left"|Indiana || align="center"|1 || align="center"| || 1 || 27 || 4 || 1 || 5 || 27.0 || 4.0 || 1.0 || 5.0 || align=center|
|-
|align="left"| || align="center"|F || align="left"|California || align="center"|2 || align="center"|– || 95 || 1,436 || 254 || 75 || 568 || 15.1 || 2.7 || 0.8 || 6.0 || align=center|
|-
|align="left"| || align="center"|F || align="left"|UCLA || align="center"|3 || align="center"|– || 160 || 3,384 || 464 || 164 || 1,759 || 21.2 || 2.9 || 1.0 || 11.0 || align=center|
|}

N to R

|-
|align="left"| || align="center"|C || align="left"|Auburn || align="center"|3 || align="center"|– || 30 || 420 || 95 || 7 || 144 || 14.0 || 3.2 || 0.2 || 4.8 || align=center|
|-
|align="left"| || align="center"|C || align="left"| Virtus Bologna || align="center"|3 || align="center"|– || 193 || 3,575 || 791 || 181 || 1,209 || 18.5 || 4.1 || 0.9 || 6.3 || align=center|
|-
|align="left"| || align="center"|C || align="left"| Estudiantes || align="center"|4 || align="center"|– || 141 || 1,754 || 388 || 72 || 446 || 12.4 || 2.8 || 0.5 || 3.2 || align=center|
|-
|align="left"| || align="center"|F || align="left"|Marquette || align="center"|1 || align="center"| || 54 || 540 || 58 || 13 || 178 || 10.0 || 1.1 || 0.2 || 3.3 || align=center|
|-
|align="left"| || align="center"|F/C || align="left"|Virginia Union || align="center"|3 || align="center"|– || 208 || 6,831 || 1,655 || 685 || 1,644 || 32.8 || 8.0 || 3.3 || 7.9 || align=center|
|-
|align="left"| || align="center"|C || align="left"|Bradley || align="center"|2 || align="center"|– || 24 || 198 || 43 || 4 || 80 || 8.3 || 1.8 || 0.2 || 3.3 || align=center|
|-
|align="left" bgcolor="#FFFF99"|^ || align="center"|C || align="left"|Houston || align="center"|1 || align="center"| || 61 || 1,378 || 366 || 66 || 435 || 22.6 || 6.0 || 1.1 || 7.1 || align=center|
|-
|align="left"| || align="center"|G/F || align="left"|Purdue || align="center"|1 || align="center"| || 4 || 43 || 5 || 1 || 11 || 10.8 || 1.3 || 0.3 || 2.8 || align=center|
|-
|align="left"| || align="center"|F/C || align="left"|Eau Claire HS || align="center"|1 || align="center"| || 41 || 1,216 || 288 || 67 || 555 || 29.7 || 7.0 || 1.6 || 13.5 || align=center|
|-
|align="left"| || align="center"|C || align="left"|Fordham || align="center"|1 || align="center"| || 5 || 139 || 32 || 2 || 33 || 27.8 || 6.4 || 0.4 || 6.6 || align=center|
|-
|align="left"| || align="center"|C || align="left"|Minnesota || align="center"|1 || align="center"| || 3 || 27 || 5 || 0 || 9 || 9.0 || 1.7 || 0.0 || 3.0 || align=center|
|-
|align="left"| || align="center"|G || align="left"|Colorado State || align="center"|2 || align="center"|– || 139 || 2,744 || 236 || 463 || 724 || 19.7 || 1.7 || 3.3 || 5.2 || align=center|
|-
|align="left"| || align="center"|G || align="left"|Arkansas || align="center"|1 || align="center"| || 5 || 71 || 4 || 12 || 18 || 14.2 || 0.8 || 2.4 || 3.6 || align=center|
|-
|align="left"| || align="center"|G || align="left"|Bradley || align="center"|3 || align="center"|– || 235 || 7,708 || 934 || 605 || 2,785 || 32.8 || 4.0 || 2.6 || 11.9 || align=center|
|-
|align="left"| || align="center"|F || align="left"|Kentucky || align="center"|4 || align="center"|– || 273 || 6,893 || 1,311 || 388 || 2,073 || 25.2 || 4.8 || 1.4 || 7.6 || align=center|
|-
|align="left"| || align="center"|F || align="left"|Michigan State || align="center"|7 || align="center"|– || 542 || 16,059 || 2,064 || 965 || 6,498 || 29.6 || 3.8 || 1.8 || 12.0 || align=center|
|-
|align="left"| || align="center"|G/F || align="left"| Élan Béarnais || align="center"|1 || align="center"| || 19 || 386 || 36 || 9 || 100 || 20.3 || 1.9 || 0.5 || 5.3 || align=center|
|-
|align="left"| || align="center"|F || align="left"|Villanova || align="center"|1 || align="center"| || 47 || 1,031 || 282 || 50 || 328 || 21.9 || 6.0 || 1.1 || 7.0 || align=center|
|-
|align="left"| || align="center"|C || align="left"|Utah || align="center"|2 || align="center"|–, 2023 || 136 || 2,150 || 558 || 69 || 732 || 15.8 || 4.1 || 0.5 || 5.4 || align=center|
|-
|align="left"| || align="center"|G || align="left"|St. John's || align="center"|1 || align="center"|– || 4 || 11 || 1 || 2 || 9 || 2.8 || .3 || .0 || 2.3 || align=center|
|-
|align="left"||| align="center"|G || align="left"|UCLA || align="center"|5 || align="center"|– || 349 || 7,037 || 854 || 477 || 3,463 || 20.2 || 2.4 || 1.4 || 9.9 || align=center|
|-
|align="left"| || align="center"|C || align="left"|Barton CC || align="center"|1 || align="center"| || 3 || 24 || 8 || 1 || 7 || 8.0 || 2.7 || 0.3 || 2.3 || align=center|
|-
|align="left"| || align="center"|G || align="left"|Michigan State || align="center"|2 || align="center"|– || 74 || 1,108 || 105 || 76 || 409 || 15.0 || 1.4 || 1.0 || 5.5 || align=center|
|-
|align="left"| || align="center"|G || align="left"|Syracuse || align="center"|2 || align="center"|– || 23 || 108 || 14 || 0 || 32 || 4.7 || 0.6 || 0.0 || 1.4 || align=center|
|-
|align="left"| || align="center"|G || align="left"|Arkansas || align="center"|1 || align="center"| || 77 || 2,478 || 342 || 323 || 718 || 32.2 || 4.4 || 4.2 || 9.3 || align=center|
|-
|align="left"| || align="center"|F/C || align="left"|Tennessee State || align="center"|3 || align="center"|– || 130 || 2,791 || 539 || 88 || 1,089 || 21.5 || 4.1 || 0.7 || 8.4 || align=center|
|-
|align="left"| || align="center"|F || align="left"|Alabama || align="center"|1 || align="center"| || 6 || 69 || 12 || 1 || 13 || 11.5 || 2.0 || 0.2 || 2.2 || align=center|
|-
|align="left"| || align="center"|G/F || align="left"|Michigan || align="center"|3 || align="center"|– || 177 || 5,914 || 607 || 595 || 2,862 || 33.4 || 3.4 || 3.4 || 16.2 || align=center|
|-
|align="left"| || align="center"|G/F || align="left"|Washington || align="center"|5 || align="center"|– || 363 || 8,444 || 945 || 319 || 3,432 || 23.3 || 2.6 || 0.9 || 9.5 || align=center|
|-
|align="left"| || align="center"|F/C || align="left"|Louisville || align="center"|1 || align="center"| || 41 || 732 || 234 || 31 || 189 || 17.9 || 5.7 || 0.8 || 4.6 || align=center|
|}

S to T

|-
|align="left"| || align="center"|F/C || align="left"|Georgia Tech || align="center"|1 || align="center"| || 25 || 482 || 97 || 39 || 149 || 19.3 || 3.9 || 1.6 || 6.0 || align=center|
|-
|align="left"| || align="center"|G || align="left"|Miami (FL) || align="center"|1 || align="center"| || 60 || 1,281 || 117 || 103 || 298 || 21.4 || 2.0 || 1.7 || 5.0 || align=center|
|-
|align="left"| || align="center"|F || align="left"| Saski Baskonia || align="center"|1 || align="center"| || 76 || 1,636 || 360 || 66 || 664 || 21.5 || 4.7 || 0.9 || 8.7 || align=center|
|-
|align="left" bgcolor="#FBCEB1"|* || align="center"|F || align="left"|New Mexico State || align="center"|5 || align="center"|– || 332 || 9,202 || 1,942 || 881 || 4,739 || 27.7 || 5.8 || 2.7 || 14.3 || align=center|
|-
|align="left"| || align="center"|F || align="left"|Wyoming || align="center"|3 || align="center"|– || 134 || 2,331 || 470 || 100 || 943 || 17.4 || 3.5 || 0.7 || 7.0 || align=center|
|-
|align="left"| || align="center"|F || align="left"| Benetton Treviso || align="center"|1 || align="center"| || 20 || 72 || 14 || 1 || 38 || 3.6 || 0.7 || 0.1 || 1.9 || align=center|
|-
|align="left"| || align="center"|G || align="left"|Clemson || align="center"|1 || align="center"| || 39 || 544 || 43 || 123 || 193 || 13.9 || 1.1 || 3.2 || 4.9 || align=center|
|-
|align="left"| || align="center"|F || align="left"|Cal State Fullerton || align="center"|3 || align="center"|– || 76 || 879 || 214 || 12 || 219 || 11.6 || 2.8 || 0.2 || 2.9 || align=center|
|-
|align="left"| || align="center"|C || align="left"|California || align="center"|4 || align="center"|– || 121 || 999 || 247 || 16 || 174 || 8.3 || 2.0 || 0.1 || 1.4 || align=center|
|-
|align="left"| || align="center"|C || align="left"|Wisconsin || align="center"|1 || align="center"| || 17 || 66 || 15 || 3 || 14 || 3.9 || 0.9 || 0.2 || 0.8 || align=center|
|-
|align="left"| || align="center"|G/F || align="left"| PAOK || align="center"|1 || align="center"| || 2 || 22 || 3 || 1 || 20 || 11.0 || 1.5 || 0.5 || 10.0 || align=center|
|-
|align="left"| || align="center"|C || align="left"|Arizona || align="center"|1 || align="center"| || 4 || 17 || 4 || 1 || 3 || 4.3 || 1.0 || 0.3 || 0.8 || align=center|
|-
|align="left"| || align="center"|G || align="left"|UTEP || align="center"|1 || align="center"| || 21 || 120 || 20 || 12 || 18 || 5.7 || 1.0 || 0.6 || 0.9 || align=center|
|-
|align="left"| || align="center"|G || align="left"|Arizona || align="center"|3 || align="center"|– || 200 || 8,209 || 828 || 1,761 || 3,917 || bgcolor="#CFECEC"|41.0 || 4.1 || 8.8 || 19.6 || align=center|
|-
|align="left"| || align="center"|G || align="left"|DePaul || align="center"|1 || align="center"| || 15 || 282 || 37 || 59 || 71 || 18.8 || 2.5 || 3.9 || 4.7 || align=center|
|-
|align="left"| || align="center"|F || align="left"|Ohio State || align="center"|1 || align="center"| || 11 || 118 || 27 || 3 || 37 || 10.7 || 2.5 || 0.3 || 3.4 || align=center|
|-
|align="left"| || align="center"|C || align="left"| Split || align="center"|3 || align="center"|– || 119 || 2,302 || 523 || 112 || 846 || 19.3 || 4.4 || 0.9 || 7.1 || align=center|
|-
|align="left"| || align="center"|G || align="left"|Abraham Lincoln HS (NY) || align="center"|1 || align="center"| || 13 || 185 || 16 || 39 || 56 || 14.2 || 1.2 || 3.0 || 4.3 || align=center|
|-
|align="left"| || align="center"|F || align="left"|Minnesota || align="center"|3 || align="center"|– || 115 || 1,237 || 245 || 28 || 326 || 10.8 || 2.1 || 0.2 || 2.8 || align=center|
|-
|align="left"||| align="center"|G || align="left"|Iowa State || align="center"|2 || align="center"|– || 67 || 632|| 82 || 31 || 273 || 9.4 || 1.2 || 0.5 || 4.1 || align=center|
|-
|align="left"| || align="center"|F/C || align="left"|Rider || align="center"|1 || align="center"| || 19 || 292 || 80 || 10 || 87 || 15.4 || 4.2 || 0.5 || 4.6 || align=center|
|-
|align="left"| || align="center"|F || align="left"|Ohio || align="center"|1 || align="center"| || 13 || 355 || 104 || 14 || 159 || 27.3 || 8.0 || 1.1 || 12.2 || align=center|
|-
|align="left" bgcolor="#CCFFCC"|x || align="center"|F || align="left"|Duke || align="center"|1 || align="center"| || 17 || 540 || 61 || 22 || 275 || 31.8 || 3.6 || 1.3 || 16.2 || align=center|
|-
|align="left"| || align="center"|F || align="left"|Texas || align="center"|2 || align="center"| || 41 || 692 || 152 || 29 || 169 || 16.9 || 3.7 || 0.7 || 4.1 || align=center|
|-
|align="left"| || align="center"|F || align="left"| Anadolu Efes || align="center"|1 || align="center"| || 74 || 2,272 || 343 || 304 || 835 || 30.7 || 4.6 || 4.1 || 11.3 || align=center|
|}

U to y

|-
|align="left"| || align="center"|G || align="left"| Split || align="center"|1 || align="center"| || 72 || 890 || 75 || 153 || 301 || 12.4 || 1.0 || 2.1 || 4.2 || align=center|
|-
|align="left"| || align="center"|G || align="left"|Tulsa || align="center"|1 || align="center"| || 16 || 357 || 63 || 59 || 77 || 22.3 || 3.9 || 3.7 || 4.8 || align=center|
|-
|align="left"| || align="center"|C || align="left"| Rytas || align="center"|7 || align="center"|– || 470 || 11,774 || 3,961 || 350 || 5,524 || 25.1 || 8.4 || 0.7 || 11.8 || align=center|
|-
|align="left" bgcolor="#CCFFCC"|x || align="center"|G || align="left"|Wichita State || align="center"|5 || align="center"|– || 283 || 7,401 || 816 || 1,270 || 3,435 || 26.2 || 2.9 || 4.5 || 12.1|| align=center|
|-
|align="left"| || align="center"|G || align="left"|Maryland || align="center"|2 || align="center"|– || 143 || 3,305 || 355 || 530 || 1,357 || 23.1 || 2.5 || 3.7 || 9.5 || align=center|
|-
|align="left"| || align="center"|F || align="left"|UConn || align="center"|1 || align="center"| || 81 || 2,361 || 521 || 88 || 1,053 || 29.1 || 6.4 || 1.1 || 13.0 || align=center|
|-
|align="left"| || align="center"|C || align="left"|UConn || align="center"|1 || align="center"| || 38 || 240 || 59 || 8 || 35 || 6.3 || 1.6 || 0.2 || 0.9 || align=center|
|-
|align="left"| || align="center"|F || align="left"|Syracuse || align="center"|2 || align="center"|– || 130 || 3,173 || 544 || 156 || 1,558 || 24.4 || 4.2 || 1.2 || 12.0 || align=center|
|-
|align="left" bgcolor="#CCFFCC"|x || align="center"|F || align="left"|George Washington || align="center"|1 || align="center"| || 50 || 723 || 159 || 40 || 218 || 14.5 || 3.2 || 0.8 || 4.4 || align=center|
|-
|align="left"| || align="center"|F || align="left"|LSU || align="center"|1 || align="center"| || 2 || 42 || 4 || 7 || 8 || 21.0 || 2.0 || 3.5 || 4.0 || align=center|
|-
|align="left"| || align="center"|F || align="left"|Fresno State || align="center"|2 || align="center"|– || 35 || 367 || 60 || 22 || 142 || 10.5 || 1.7 || 0.6 || 4.1 || align=center|
|-
|align="left"| || align="center"|G/F || align="left"|Arkansas || align="center"|2 || align="center"|– || 128 || 2,781 || 345 || 205 || 1,063 || 21.7 || 2.7 || 1.6 || 8.3 || align=center|
|-
|align="left"| || align="center"|G || align="left"|Northern Illinois || align="center"|1 || align="center"| || 27 || 259 || 12 || 36 || 59 || 9.6 || 0.4 || 1.3 || 2.2 || align=center|
|-
|align="left"| || align="center"|F || align="left"|Jackson State || align="center"|1 || align="center"| || 8 || 122 || 25 || 2 || 40 || 15.3 || 3.1 || 0.3 || 5.0 || align=center|
|-
|align="left"| || align="center"|F/C || align="left"|Xavier || align="center"|2 || align="center"|– || 37 || 264 || 44 || 3 || 61 || 7.1 || 1.2 || 0.1 || 1.6 || align=center|
|-
|align="left"| || align="center"|G || align="left"|Villanova || align="center"|8 || align="center"|– || 417 || 11,736 || 1,079 || 1,791 || 3,876 || 28.1 || 2.6 || 4.3 || 9.3 || align=center|
|-
|align="left"| || align="center"|F || align="left"|Providence || align="center"|2 || align="center"|– || 62 || 935 || 127 || 65 || 250 || 15.1 || 2.0 || 1.0 || 4.0 || align=center|
|-
|align="left"| || align="center"|F/C || align="left"|Ohio State || align="center"|1 || align="center"| || 1 || 31 || 8 || 0 || 6 || 31.0 || 8.0 || 0.0 || 6.0 || align=center|
|-
|align="left"| || align="center"|F || align="left"|Georgetown || align="center"|4 || align="center"|– || 180 || 4,772 || 1,268 || 194 || 1,417 || 26.5 || 7.0 || 1.1 || 7.9 || align=center|
|-
|align="left"| || align="center"|G || align="left"|South Gwinnett HS (GA) || align="center"|1 || align="center"| || 80 || 2,016 || 151 || 164 || 1,242 || 25.2 || 1.9 || 2.1 || 15.5 || align=center|
|-
|align="left"| || align="center"|G || align="left"|Baylor || align="center"|1 || align="center"| || 2 || 15 || 1 || 0 || 2 || 7.5 || 0.5 || 0.0 || 1.0 || align=center|
|-
|align="left"| || align="center"|G/F || align="left"|Maryland || align="center"|2 || align="center"|– || 101 || 3,523 || 485 || 266 || 1,547 || 34.9 || 4.8 || 2.6 || 15.3 || align=center|
|-
|align="left"| || align="center"|F || align="left"|Arkansas || align="center"|1 || align="center"| || 42 || 886 || 153 || 33 || 390 || 21.1 || 3.6 || 0.8 || 9.3 || align=center|
|-
|align="left"| || align="center"|F/C || align="left"|Michigan State || align="center"|3 || align="center"|– || 156 || 3,666 || 1,055 || 137 || 1,417 || 23.5 || 6.8 || 0.9 || 9.1 || align=center|
|-
|align="left"| || align="center"|F || align="left"|Michigan || align="center"|1 || align="center"| || 4 || 54 || 16 || 5 || 30 || 13.5 || 4.0 || 1.3 || 7.5 || align=center|
|-
|align="left"| || align="center"|F/C || align="left"|Arizona || align="center"|2 || align="center"|– || 72 || 1,036 || 330 || 21 || 238 || 14.4 || 4.6 || 0.3 || 3.3 || align=center|
|-
|align="left"| || align="center"|G || align="left"|Oral Roberts || align="center"|1 || align="center"| || 13 || 102 || 9 || 17 || 20 || 7.8 || 0.7 || 1.3 || 1.5 || align=center|
|-
|align="left"| || align="center"|G/F || align="left"|Texas A&M || align="center"|1 || align="center"| || 67 || 1,392 || 190 || 71 || 435 || 20.8 || 2.8 || 1.1 || 6.5 || align=center|
|-
|align="left"| || align="center"|G || align="left"|Utah || align="center"|4 || align="center"|– || 172 || 3,005 || 408 || 398 || 1,145 || 17.5 || 2.4 || 2.3 || 6.7 || align=center|
|-
|align="left"| || align="center"|F || align="left"|Kansas || align="center"|1 || align="center"| || 52 || 766 || 118 || 58 || 188 || 14.7 || 2.3 || 1.1 || 3.6 || align=center|
|-
|align="left"| || align="center"|F/C || align="left"|Clemson || align="center"|3 || align="center"|– || 78 || 1,351 || 252 || 43 || 587 || 17.3 || 3.2 || 0.6 || 7.5 || align=center|
|-
|align="left" bgcolor="#CCFFCC"|x || align="center"|F || align="left"|Georgia Tech || align="center"|1 || align="center"| || 26 || 475 || 115 || 45 || 164 || 18.3 || 4.4 || 1.7 || 6.3 || align=center|
|}

References

External links
 Toronto Raptors all-time roster

National Basketball Association all-time rosters

roster